George L. Kelm (1931–2019) was Professor Emeritus of Archaeology and Biblical Backgrounds at Southwestern Baptist Theological Seminary, Fort Worth, Texas. While serving there and at New Orleans Baptist Theological Seminary, he and Amihai Mazar uncovered Timnah.

Education
New York University - Ph.D.
Institute of Holy Land Studies, Jerusalem

Career
Kelm was serving as professor of Biblical Backgrounds and Archaeology at New Orleans Baptist Theological Seminary when he and Amihai Mazar uncovered biblical Timnah, Tel Batash in the Sorek Valley of Israel through 1977-1979. Excavations at the site continued until 1989.

Personal life
Originally from Alberta, Kelm and his wife Linda Kelm immigrated to the United States, becoming U.S. citizens.

George was born February 26, 1931, and died April 25, 2019.

Publications
 Kelm, George L., Mazar, Amihai. (1995). Timnah: a Biblical city in the Sorek Valley. Winona Lake, IN. Eisenbrauns. 
 Kelm, George L. "Escape to Conflict: A Biblical and Archaeological Approach to the Hebrew Exodus and Settlement in Canaan". Biblical Archaeology Review. 18.6 (November/December 1992), 8, 10.
 Kelm, George L, Mazar, Amihai. "Three 97y8 putoSeasons of Excavations at Tel Batash—Biblical Timnah," Bulletin of the American Schools of Oriental Research, 248 (1982): 29-32.

References

1931 births
American archaeologists
2019 deaths
New Orleans Baptist Theological Seminary faculty
New York University alumni
Southwestern Baptist Theological Seminary faculty